Codo de Pozuzo District is one of five districts of the province Puerto Inca in Peru.

History 

Codo del Pozuzo is a racial integration of Europeans (Austrians and Germanise), Peruvian ethnic group and different provinces of the country. This district is situated in the central jungle, and has progressed very fast by its own people, for their authorities and for their wide and flat country.

References

External links
 Municipal web site